Dawid Andrzej Kupczyk (born 10 May 1977 in Jelenia Góra) is a Polish bobsledder who has competed since 1997. Competing in five Winter Olympics, he earned his best finish of 14th in the four-man event at Vancouver in 2010.

Kupczyk also competed in the FIBT World Championships, earning his best finish of 20th in the four-man event both at Calgary in 2005 and at St. Moritz in 2007.

He was born in Jelenia Góra as a son of runner Andrzej Kupczyk.

References

External links
 1998 bobsleigh four-man results
 2002 bobsleigh four-man results
 2006 bobsleigh four-man results
 Bobsleighsport.com profile
 
 Wirtualna Polska profile 

1977 births
Bobsledders at the 1998 Winter Olympics
Bobsledders at the 2002 Winter Olympics
Bobsledders at the 2006 Winter Olympics
Bobsledders at the 2010 Winter Olympics
Bobsledders at the 2014 Winter Olympics
Living people
Polish male bobsledders
Olympic bobsledders of Poland
People from Jelenia Góra
Sportspeople from Lower Silesian Voivodeship